2019 World Cup can refer to:
 2019 Archery World Cup
 2019 FIBA 3x3 World Cup
 2019 FIBA Basketball World Cup
 2019 FIBA Under-19 Basketball World Cup
 2019 FIBA Under-19 Women's Basketball World Cup
 2019–20 Biathlon World Cup
 2019 Canoe Slalom World Cup
 Chess World Cup 2019
 2019 IFSC Climbing World Cup
 2019 Cricket World Cup
 2019–20 FIS Cross-Country World Cup, cross-country skiing
 2019 PDC World Cup of Darts
 2019 Dubai World Cup, horse racing
 2019 Kabaddi World Cup
 WKN World Cup 2019, kickboxing and martial arts
 2019 WMF World Cup, minifootball
 2019 UCI Mountain Bike World Cup, mountain bike racing
 2019 Orienteering World Cup
 2019 Overwatch World Cup
 2019 Netball World Cup
 2019 World Cup of Pool
 2019 Kremlin World Cup, pool
 2019 Roller Hockey World Cup
 2019 Rugby World Cup
 2019 ISSF World Cup, shooting events
 2019–20 FIS Ski Jumping World Cup
 2019 FIFA Beach Soccer World Cup
 2019 FIFA Club World Cup
 2019 FIFA U-17 World Cup
 2019 FIFA U-20 World Cup
 2019 FIFA Women's World Cup
 2019 World Cup (snooker)
 2019 FINA Swimming World Cup
 2019 ITTF Men's World Cup, table tennis
 2019 ITTF Team World Cup, table tennis
 2019 ITTF Women's World Cup, table tennis
 2019 FIVB Volleyball Men's World Cup
 2019 FIVB Volleyball Women's World Cup